Chauncey Heath may refer to:

 Chauncey E. Heath (1881–1965), member of the Wisconsin State Assembly
 Chauncey G. Heath (1818–1899), member of the Wisconsin State Assembly